The Chicago Urban League, established in 1916 in Chicago, Illinois, is an affiliate of the National Urban League that develops programs and partnerships and engages in advocacy to address the need for employment, entrepreneurship, affordable housing and quality education. As a consequence of the Northern Migration the League was established by an interracial group of community leaders as a resettlement organization assisting African-American migrants arriving in Chicago.

Barbara A. Lumpkin was appointed Interim President and CEO of the Chicago Urban League in June 2018.

Reports
Still Separate ..., published in 2005, found that Chicago had the fifth most racially segregated residential metropolitan area in the United States.

 The Vicious Circle: Race, Prison, Jobs and Community in Chicago, Illinois and the Nation (Chicago Urban League, 2002)  
 Still Separate, Unequal, Race: Place and Policy in Chicago (Chicago Urban League, 2005)

Supporters 
 Earl W. Renfroe
 Mary Morello
 Parents for Rock and Rap
 Joanna Snowden Porter

References

External links 
 Chicago Urban League
 Metropolitan Board of the Chicago Urban League
 "ProjectNEXT not all things to all people" - Article on League's transition to focusing on economic development
 Chicago Urban League Photos - images of the Chicago Urban League, mostly in the 1950s to the 1970s, from the University of Illinois at Chicago

Organizations based in Chicago
African Americans' rights organizations
1916 establishments in Illinois
African-American refugees
African-American history between emancipation and the civil rights movement
African-American demographics
History of the Midwestern United States
History of the Southern United States
Internal migrations in the United States
20th century in the United States